SS Dresden was a freight vessel built for the Yorkshire Coal and Steamship Company in 1877.

History

The ship was built by William Thompson of Dundee for the Yorkshire Coal and Steamship Company and launched on 13 February 1877. She was launched by Miss Meek, eldest daughter of Alexander Meek of Glenville, Brough,

In 1895 she was acquired by the Goole Steam Shipping Company. In 1904 she was acquired by the West Hartlepool Steam Navigation Company. In 1916 she was sold to Mann Macneal and Company Limited, Glasgow who kept her until 1925 when she was scrapped.

References

1877 ships
Steamships of the United Kingdom
Ships built in Dundee